Clark Brandon (born December 13, 1958) is an American actor. His most notable roles were as Max Merlin's apprentice Zachary Rogers in the CBS series Mr. Merlin, as Chris Richards on ABC's "Out of the Blue," and as Sean Fitzpatrick, the older brother, in the CBS series The Fitzpatricks. He also starred with Jim Varney in the 1989 comedy film, Fast Food.

Brandon also directed three films: Dark Secrets (1992), Skeeter (1993) and The Last Road (1997).

Until 2018, he was Dean of Students at Areté Preparatory Academy in Southern California.

Filmography

Actor

Director

References

External links 
 

1958 births
American male television actors
Living people
American film directors
American screenwriters
20th-century American male actors